Betty in Blunderland is a Fleischer Studios animated short film starring Betty Boop, which as released on the 6th of April in 1934. Also known as Betty in Flunkerland.

It is based on Alice's Adventures in Wonderland and Through the Looking-Glass by Lewis Carroll.

Plot
Betty falls asleep doing a jigsaw puzzle of Alice and the white rabbit. She "awakes" just in time to follow the rabbit through the looking glass and disguises as Alice into a modern wonderland. Betty meets most of the traditional inhabitants of Wonderland and sings "How Do You Do" (to the tune of "Everyone Says I Love You") to them. When the Jabberwock steals Betty away, everyone comes to her rescue. Betty wakes up back in her living room, just in time to prevent the white rabbit from again escaping from her puzzle.

Quotes 
 Betty Boop: "Oh, Where am I?"
 Betty Boop: "Thank you!"
 Betty Boop: "Oh, Jam!"
 Betty Boop: "Oh, The crazy Mad Hatter?"

Cast and crew 
 Bonnie Poe as Betty Boop
 Max Fleischer (Producer)
 Dave Fleischer (Director)
 Roland Crandall (Animator)
 Thomas Johnson (Animator)

Music 
 "Everyone Says I Love You"
 "Hungarian Rhapsody No. 2"
 "Have You Ever Seen a Dream Walking?"
 "The Irish Washerwoman"

Trivia 
 Betty in Blunderland has been played in a feature film.
 This is the only cartoon to feature Betty Boop with long hair.
 Betty Boop previously performed "Everyone Says I Love You" in Time On My Hands as performed by Mae Questel.
 This Betty Boop cartoon has the same visuals as Paramount's feature film adaptation.

References

External links
 Betty in Blunderland at the Big Cartoon Database.
 Betty in Blunderland on YouTube.
 

1930s English-language films
1934 animated films
1934 comedy films
1934 short films
1930s American animated films
1930s animated short films
Animated films based on Alice in Wonderland
Betty Boop cartoons
American black-and-white films
Paramount Pictures short films
Fleischer Studios short films
Films based on Alice in Wonderland
Short films directed by Dave Fleischer
American comedy short films
American animated short films